Distribution law or the Nernst's distribution law gives a generalisation which governs the distribution of a solute between two non miscible solvents. This law was first given by Nernst who studied the distribution of several solutes between different appropriate pairs of solvents.

C1/C2 = Kd

Where Kd is called the distribution coefficient or the partition coefficient.
Concentration of X in solvent A/concentration of X in solvent B=Kď
If C1 denotes the concentration of solute X in solvent A & C2 denotes  the concentration of solute X in solvent B; Nernst's distribution law can be expressed as C1/C2 = Kd. This law is only valid if the solute is in the same molecular form in both the solvents. Sometimes the solute dissociates or associates in the solvent.
In such cases the law is modified as,
D(Distribution factor)=concentration of solute in all forms in solvent 1/concentration of solute in all forms in solvent 2.

Further reading
 Martin's Physical Pharmacy & pharmaceutical sciences; fifth edition, Patrick.J.Sinko , Lippincott Williams & Wilkins. Note, this source does not describe Nernst in the manner the text presents, nor is it evident that it is the source of the quotation (as much as one can surmise through search). Lacking full information (i.e., page number), the source is moved to Further reading.

References

Equilibrium chemistry
Walther Nernst